The 2015 Philippine Basketball Association (PBA) Commissioner's Cup Finals was the best-of-seven championship series of the 2015 PBA Commissioner's Cup, and the conclusion of the conference's playoffs. Rain or Shine and Talk 'N Text competed for the 15th Commissioner's Cup championship and the 114th overall championship contested by the league.

Background

Road to the finals

Head-to-head matchup

Series summary
*number of overtimes

Game 1

Game 2

Game 3

Game 4

Game 5

Game 6

Game 7

Rosters

{| class="toccolours" style="font-size: 95%; width: 100%;"
|-
! colspan="2" style="background-color: #; color: #; text-align: center;" | Talk 'N Text Tropang Texters 2015 Commissioner's Cup roster
|- style="background-color:#; color: #; text-align: center;"
! Players !! Coaches
|-
| valign="top" |
{| class="sortable" style="background:transparent; margin:0px; width:100%;"
! Pos. !! # !! POB !! Name !! Height !! Weight !! !! College 
|-
 

{| class="toccolours" style="font-size: 95%; width: 100%;"
|-
! colspan="2" style="background-color: #; color: #; text-align: center;" | Rain or Shine Elasto Painters 2015 Commissioner's Cup roster
|- style="background-color:#; color: #; text-align: center;"
! Players !! Coaches
|-
| valign="top" |
{| class="sortable" style="background:transparent; margin:0px; width:100%;"
! Pos. !! # !! POB !! Name !! Height !! Weight !! !! College 
|-

  also serves as Rain or Shine's board governor.

Broadcast notes

Additional Game 7 crew:
Trophy presentation: Dominic Uy and Carla Lizardo
Dugout interviewer: Sel Guevara

References

External links
PBA official website

2015
2014–15 PBA season
Rain or Shine Elasto Painters games
TNT Tropang Giga games
PBA Commissioner's Cup Finals